The Harness Tracks of America Driver of the Year is an American harness racing award for drivers of Standardbred racehorses. Created in 1968, it is awarded annually.

With ten wins, Hervé Filion has won this award more than any other driver.

Past winners:
 2022 : Dexter Dunn
 2021 : Dexter Dunn
 2020 : Dexter Dunn
 2019 : Dexter Dunn
 2018 : Aaron Merriman
 2017 : Yannick Gingras
 2016 : David Miller
 2015 : David Miller
 2014 : Yannick Gingras
 2013 : Dave Palone
 2012 : Tim Tetrick
 2011 : George Brennan
 2010 : George Brennan
 2009 : Jody Jamieson / Dave Palone
 2008 : Tim Tetrick
 2007 : Tim Tetrick
 2006 : Tony Morgan
 2005 : Catello Manzi
 2004 : Dave Palone
 2003 : Dave Palone
 2002 : Tony Morgan
 2001 : Stephane Bouchard
 2000 : Dave Palone
 1999 : Dave Palone
 1998 : Walter Case, Jr.
 1997 : Tony Morgan
 1996 : Tony Morgan / Luc Ouellette
 1995 : Luc Ouellette

 1994 : Dave Magee
 1993 : Jack Moiseyev
 1992 : Walter Case, Jr.
 1991 : Walter Case, Jr.
 1990 : John Campbell 
 1989 : Hervé Filion
 1988 : John Campbell
 1987 : Michel Lachance
 1986 : Michel Lachance
 1985 : Michel Lachance
 1984 : Bill O'Donnell
 1983 : John Campbell
 1982 : Bill O'Donnell 
 1981 : Hervé Filion
 1980 : Ron Waples
 1979 : Ron Waples
 1978 : Carmine Abbatiello / Hervé Filion
 1977 : Donald Dancer
 1976 : Hervé Filion
 1975 : Joe O'Brien
 1974 : Hervé Filion
 1973 : Hervé Filion
 1972 : Hervé Filion
 1971 : Hervé Filion
 1970 : Hervé Filion
 1969 : Hervé Filion
 1968 : Stanley Dancer

See also
Eclipse Award for Outstanding Jockey

References

People in harness racing
Harness racing in the United States
American horse racing awards